The complete bibliography of Gordon R. Dickson.

Collections and anthologies

1950s
 1957 Earthman's Burden, with Poul Anderson (Gnome, hc, collection)
 "The Sheriff of Canyon Gulch", aka "Heroes Are Made" (1951, ss)
 "Don Jones" (original nv)
 "In Hoka Signo Vinces" (1953, ss)
 "The Adventure of the Misplaced Hound" (1953, nv)
 "Yo Ho Hoka!" (1955, nv)
 "The Tiddlywink Warriors" (1955, nv)

1960s
 1963 Rod Serling's Triple W: Witches, Warlocks and Werewolves, ghost-edited by Dickson (Bantam, pb, collection)
 "The Amulet" (1959, ss)
 1967 Rod Serling's Devils and Demons, ghost-edited by Dickson (Bantam, pb, collection)

1970s
 1970 Danger—Human (Doubleday, hc, collection)
 "Danger - Human!" (1957, ss)
 "Dolphin's Way" (1964, ss)
 "And Then There Was Peace" (1962, ss)
 "The Man from Earth" (1964, ss)
 "Black Charlie" (1954, ss)
 "Zeepsday" (1956, ss)
 "Lulungomeena" (1954, ss)
 "An Honorable Death" (1961, ss)
 "Flat Tiger" (1956, ss)
 "James" (1955, ss)
 "The Quarry" (1958, ss)
 "Call Him Lord" (1966, ss)
 "Steel Brother" (1952, nv)
 1970 Mutants (Macmillan, hc, collection)
 "Warrior" (1965, nv)
 "Of the People" (1955, ss)
 "Danger - Human!" (1957, ss)
 "Rehabilitated" (1961, ss)
 "Listen" (1952, ss)
 "Roofs of Silver" (1962, nv)
 "By New Hearth Fires" (1959, ss)
 "Idiot Solvant" (1962, ss)
 "The Immortal" (1965, nv)
 "Miss Prinks" (1954, ss)
 "Home from the Shore" (1963, nv)
 1973 The Book of Gordon Dickson, retitle of 1970s Danger—Human (DAW, pb, collection)
 1973 The Star Road (Doubleday, hc, collection)
 "Whatever Gods There Be" (1961, ss)
 "Hilifter", aka "None But Man" (1963, ss)
 "Building on the Line" (1968, nv)
 "The Christmas Present" (1958, ss)
 "Three-Part Puzzle" (1962, ss)
 "On Messenger Mountain" (1964, na)
 "The Catch" (1959, ss)
 "Jackal's Meal" (1969, nv)
 "The Mousetrap" (1952, ss)
 1974 Ancient, My Enemy (Doubleday, hc, collection)
 "Ancient, My Enemy", (1969, nv)
 "The Odd Ones", (1955, ss)
 "The Monkey Wrench", (1951, ss)
 "Tiger Green", (1965, nv)
 "The Friendly Man", (1951, ss)
 "Love Me True", (1961, ss)
 "Our First Death", (1955, nv)
 "In the Bone", (1966, ss)
 "The Bleak and Barren Land", (1953, nv)
 1975 Combat SF, Gordon R. Dickson ed, (Doubleday, hc, anthology)
 "Ricochet on Miza" (1952, ss)
 1978 Gordon R. Dickson's SF Best, James R. Frenkel ed, (Dell, pb, collection)
 "Hilifter", (1963, ss)
 "Brother Charlie", (1958, nv)
 "Act of Creation", (1957, ss)
 "Idiot Solvant", (1962, ss)
 "Call Him Lord", (1966, ss)
 "Tiger Green", (1965, nv)
 "Of the People", (1955, ss)
 "Dolphin's Way", (1964, ss)
 "In the Bone", (1966, ss)
 1978 Nebula Winners Twelve, Gordon R. Dickson ed, (collection: Harper & Row, hc; Bantam, pb, 1979)
 1979 The Spirit of Dorsai (Ace, pb, collection)
 "Amanda Morgan", (original na)
 "Brothers", (1973, na)

1980s
 1980 In Iron Years (collection: Doubleday, hc; Ace, pb, 1981)
 "In Iron Years" (nv)
 "Homecoming" (ss)
 "A Taste of Tenure" (nv)
 "The Hours Are Good" (ss)
 "Gifts" (ss)
 "Zeepsday" (ss)
 "Things Which Are Caesar's" (na)
 1980 Lost Dorsai (Ace, tp, collection)
 "Lost Dorsai" (revised na)
 "Warrior" (nv)
 "The Final Encyclopedia: An Excerpt"
 1981 Love Not Human, (Ace, pb, collection)
 "Black Charlie" (ss)
 "Moon, June, Spoon, Croon" (ss)
 "The Summer Visitors" (ss)
 "Listen" (ss)
 "Graveyard" (nv)
 "Fido" (ss)
 "The Breaking of Jerry McCloud" (ss)
 "Love Me True" (ss)
 "The Christmas Present" (ss)
 "It Hardly Seems Fair" (ss)
 "The Monster and the Maiden", aka "The Mortal and the Monster" (na)
 1983 Hoka! with Poul Anderson  (Wallaby, tp, collection)
 "Joy in Mudville" (nv)
 "Undiplomatic Immunity" (nv)
 "Full Pack (Hokas Wild)" (nv)
 "The Napoleon Crime" (nv)
 1983 The Man from Earth (Tor, pb, collection)
 "Call Him Lord" (ss)
 "The Odd Ones" (ss)
 "In the Bone" (ss)
 "Danger—Human" (ss)
 "Tiger Green" (nv)
 "The Man from Earth" (ss)
 "Ancient, My Enemy" (nv)
 "The Bleak and Barren Land" (nv)
 "Steel Brother" (nv)
 "Love Me True" (ss)
 1984 Survival! (Baen, pb, collection)
 "After the Funeral", (ss)
 "Breakthrough Gang", (ss)
 "Button, Button", (ss)
 "Carry Me Home", (nv)
 "Friend for Life", (ss)
 "The General and the Axe", (nv)
 "Jean Dupres", (nv)
 "No Shield from the Dead", (ss)
 "Our First Death", (nv)
 "The Question", (ss)
 "Rescue", (ss)
 "The Underground", (nv)
 1984 Dickson! (NESFA Press, hc, collection, limited ed)
 "Childe Cycle: Status 1984" (updated article)
 "The Hard Way" (nv)
 "The Law-Twister Shorty" (nv)
 "Out of the Darkness" (ss)
 "Perfectly Adjusted" (na)
 "Steel Brother" (nv)
 1985 Steel Brother, retitle of Dickson! plus one story (Tor, pb, collection)
 "The Man in the Mailbag" (nv)
 1985 Beyond the Dar Al-Harb (Tor, pb, collection)
 "Beyond the Dar Al-Harb" (original na)
 "On Messenger Mountain" (na)
 "Things Which Are Caesar's" (na)
 1985 Forward! Sandra Miesel ed (Baen, pb, collection)
 "Babes in the Wood" (ss)
 "Building on the Line" (nv)
 "The Dreamsman" (ss)
 "The Game of Five" (nv)
 "Guided Tour" (verse)
 "Napoleon's Skullcap" (nv)
 "One on Trial" (ss)
 "The Queer Critter" (ss)
 "The R of A" (ss)
 "Rescue Mission" (ss)
 "Robots are Nice?" (ss)
 "Twig" (nv)
 1985 Invaders! (Baen, pb, collection)
 "The Error of Their Ways" (ss)
 "Fellow of the Bees" (nv)
 "The Invaders" (na)
 "Itco's Strong Right Arm" (nv)
 "The Law-Twister Shorty" (nv)
 "An Ounce of Emotion" (nv)
 "Ricochet on Miza" (ss)
 "Roofs of Silver" (nv)
 1986 The Dorsai Companion, with Sandra Miesel explanations (Ace, pb, collection)
 "Amanda Morgan" (na)
 "Brothers" (na)
 "Lost Dorsai" (revised na)
 "Warrior" (nv)
 1986 The Last Dream, (Baen, pb, collection)
 "The Amulet" (ss)
 "A Case History" (ss)
 "The Girl Who Played Wolf" (ss)
 "The Haunted Village" (nv)
 "The Last Dream" (ss)
 "The Present State of Igneos Research" (article)
 "Salmanazar" (ss)
 "St. Dragon and the George" (nv)
 "The Three" (ss)
 "Walker Between the Planes" (na)
 "With Butter and Mustard", (ss)
 "Ye Prentice and Ye Dragon" (verse)
 1986 The Man the Worlds Rejected, 7 story collection,  Tor (pb)
 In Iron Years, (nv)
 Jackal's Meal, (nv)
 The Man the Worlds Rejected, (nv)
 A Matter of Perspective, (article)
 Minotaur, (ss)
 The Monster and the Maiden, (na)
 Strictly Confidential, (ss)
 Turnabout, (nv)
 1986 Mindspan, collection of 12 stories, Baen (pb)
 Ballad of the Shoshonu, (song)
 Catch a Tartar, (nv)
 The Faithful Wilf, (ss)
 Fleegl of Fleegl, (ss)
 A Matter of Technique, (ss)
 Miss Prinks, (ss)
 Operation P-Button, (vignette)
 Rex and Mr. Rejilla, (ss)
 Show Me the Way to Go Home, (ss)
 Sleight of Wit, (nv)
 Soupstone, (nv)
 Who Dares a Bulbur Eat? (ss)
 A Wobble in Wockii Futures, (nv)
 1987 In the Bone: The Best Science Fiction of Gordon R. Dickson, 11 stories, Ace (pb)
 Expands 1978's Gordon R. Dickson's SF Best
 Act of Creation, (ss)
 Brother Charlie, (nv)
 Call Him Lord, (ss)
 Dolphin's Way, (ss)
 God Bless Them, (nv)
 Hilifter (aka None But Man), (ss)
 Idiot Solvant, (ss)
 In the Bone, (ss)
 Of the People, (ss)
 Tiger Green, (nv)
 Twig, (nv)
 1987 The Stranger, sf collection of 14 stories,  Tor (pb)
 And Then There Was Peace, (ss)
 The Catch, (ss)
 Cloak and Stagger, (nv)
 E Gubling Dow, (ss)
 The Friendly Man, (ss)
 God Bless Them, (nv)
 The Green Building, (ss)
 IT, Out of Darkest Jungle, (play)
 James, (ss)
 MX Knows Best, (nv)
 The Quarry, (ss)
 The Stranger, (ss)
 Tempus Non Fugit, (nv)
 Three-Part Puzzle, (ss)
 1988 Beginnings, collection of 10 stories, Baen (pb)
 The Brown Man, (verse)
 Cloak and Stagger, (nv)
 Danger - Human!, (ss)
 Idiot Solvant, (ss)
 Listen, (ss)
 On Messenger Mountain, (na)
 Powerway Emergency, (ss)
 Seats of Hell, (na)
 Soldier, Ask Not, (na)
 Strictly Confidential, (ss)
 Three-Part Puzzle, (ss)
 untitled verse from The Final Encyclopedia
 1988 Ends, collection of 12 stories, Baen (pb)
 Ancient, My Enemy, (nv)
 And Then There Was Peace, (ss)
 Armageddon, (verse)
 By New Hearth Fires, (ss)
 Call Him Lord, (ss)
 Computers Don't Argue, (ss)
 Enter a Pilgrim, (ss)
 An Honorable Death, (ss)
 Lost Dorsai, (na)
 Last Voyage, (ss)
 Minotaur, (ss)
 A Outrance, (verse)
 Turnabout, (nv)
 Whatever Gods There Be, (ss)
 1988 Guided Tour, 14 story collection,  Tor (pb)
 Counter-Irritant, (ss)
 Flat Tiger, (ss)
 Guided Tour, (verse)
 Hilifter, (ss)
 I've Been Trying to Tell You, (ss)
 Last Voyage, (ss)
 Lulungomeena, (ss)
 The Monkey Wrench, (ss)
 The Mousetrap, (ss)
 An Ounce of Emotion, (nv)
 The Rebels, (ss)
 Rehabilitated, (ss)
 The Star Fool, (ss)
 Time Grabber, (ss)

1990s
 1991 The Harriers, anthology edited by Dickson, Baen (pb)
 1993 Blood and War (The Harriers, Vol 2), anthology edited by Dickson, Baen (pb)
 1998 Hoka! Hoka! Hoka!, exp of 1957's Earthman's Burden w Poul Anderson, Baen (pb)
 The Adventure of the Misplaced Hound, (nv)
 Don Jones, (nv)
 In Hoka Signo Vinces, (ss)
 Joy in Mudville, (nv)
 The Sheriff of Canyon Gulch (aka Heroes Are Made), (ss)
 The Tiddlywink Warriors, (nv)
 Undiplomatic Immunity, (nv)
 Yo Ho Hoka! (nv)

2000s
 2000 Hokas Pokas! (w Poul Anderson), collection/omnibus, Baen (pb)
 Full Pack (Hokas Wild), (nv)
 The Napoleon Crime, (nv)
 Star Prince Charlie, (1975 novel)
 2003 The Human Edge, 12 previously collected stories, H. Davis ed, Baen (pb)
 Brother Charlie, (nv)
 The Catch, (ss)
 Danger—Human, (ss)
 The Game of Five, (nv)
 The Hard Way, (nv)
 In the Bone, (ss)
 Jackal's Meal, (nv)
 On Messenger Mountain, (na)
 An Ounce of Emotion, (nv)
 Sleight of Wit, (nv)
 Three-Part Puzzle, (ss)
 Tiger Green, (nv)

Novels

1950s
 1956 Alien From Arcturus, sf novel, Ace D-139  
 1956 Mankind on the Run, sf novel, Ace D-164 db
 1959 Dorsai!, sf novel, Astounding: May, June and July

1960s
 1960 The Genetic General, abridged retitle of Dorsai!, sf novel, Ace D-449 
 1960 Secret Under the Sea, young-adult sf novel, Henry Holt
 1960 Time to Teleport, sf novel, Ace D-449 
 1961 Delusion World, sf novel, Ace F-119 
 1961 Naked to the Stars, sf novel, The Magazine of Fantasy & Science Fiction: October and November;   Pyramid (paperback) 
 1961 Spacial Delivery, sf novel, Ace  F-119 
 1962 Necromancer, sf novel, Doubleday
 1963 No Room For Man, retitle of Necromancer, Macfadden
 1963 Secret Under Antarctica, young-adult sf novel, Holt, Rinehart & Winston
 1964 Secret Under the Caribbean, young-adult sf novel, Holt, Rinehart & Winston
 1965 The Alien Way, sf novel, Bantam
 1965 Mission to Universe, sf novel, Berkley
 1965 Space Winners, young-adult sf novel, Holt, Rinehart & Winston
 1967 Planet Run (with Keith Laumer), sf novel, Doubleday
 1967 Soldier, Ask Not, sf novel, Dell
 1967 The Space Swimmers, sf novel, Berkley
 1969 None But Man, sf novel, Doubleday (DAW 266)
 1969 Spacepaw, sf novel, Ace
 1969 Wolfling, sf novel, Analog: January, February and March; Dell (paperback)

1970s
 1970 The Hour of the Horde, sf novel, Putnam
 1970 Tactics of Mistake, sf novel, Analog: October, November and December 1970 / January 1971 (Doubleday, 1971)
 1971 The Outposter, sf novel, Analog: May, June, and July (Lippincott 1972)
 1971 Sleepwalker's World, sf novel, Lippincott
 1972 The Pritcher Mass, sf novel, Analog: August, September and October (Doubleday)
 1973 Alien Art, sf novel, Dutton
 1973 The Far Call, sf novel, Analog: August, September and October (Dial Press 1978)
 1973 The R-Master, sf novel, Lippincott (DAW 137)
 1974 Gremlins, Go Home!, young-adult sf novel (with Ben Bova), St. Martin's
 1975 Lifeboat (with Harry Harrison), sf novel, Analog: February, March and April
 1975 Star Prince Charlie (with Poul Anderson), young-adult sf novel, Putnam
 1975 Three to Dorsai!, 3 novel omnibus, Doubleday (hardcover)
 Dorsai!, 1959 novel
 Necromancer, 1962 novel
 Tactics of Mistake, 1970 novel
 1976 The Dragon and the George, fantasy novel, SF Book Club British Fantasy Award
 1976 The Lifeship, (retitle of Lifeboat), sf novel, Harper & Row
 1977 Time-Storm, sf novel, St. Martin's
 1978 Home From the Shore, sf novel, Ace
 1978 Pro, sf novel, Ace
 1979 Arcturus Landing (revision of 1956's Alien From Arcturus), Ace
 1979 Masters of Everon, sf novel, SF Book Club

1980s
 1984 The Final Encyclopedia, sf novel, Ace (paperback)  and  Tor (hardcover)
 1984 Jamie the Red (with Roland Green), sword & sorcery fantasy novel, Ace (paperback)
 1984 The Last Master, rewrite of 1973's The R-Master,  Tor (paperback)
 1985 Secrets of the Deep, omnibus of 3 young-adult sf novels, Critic's Choice (paperback)
 Secret Under the Sea, 1960 novel
 Secret Under Antarctica, 1963 novel
 Secret Under the Caribbean, 1964 novel
 1986 The Forever Man, sf novel, Ace
 1986 On the Run, retitle of 1956's Mankind on the Run,  Tor (paperback)
 1987 Way of the Pilgrim, sf novel, Ace (hardcover  and paperback)
 1988 The Chantry Guild, sf novel, Ace (hardcover and paperback)
 1989 The Earth Lords, fantasy novel, Ace (paperback)  (Sphere UK)

1990s
 1990 The Dragon Knight, fantasy novel,  Tor (hardcover)
 1990 Wolf and Iron, sf novel, Easton and Tor (hardcover)
 1991 Naked to the Stars/The Alien Way, two sf novel omnibus, Tor double (paperback)
 Naked to the Stars, 1961 novel
 The Alien Way, 1965 novel
 1991 Young Bleys, sf novel,  Tor (hardcover  and paperback)
 1992 The Dragon on the Border, fantasy novel, Ace]] (hardcover and paperback)
 1992 The Dragon at War, fantasy novel, Ace (hardcover and paperback)  and SF Book Club
 1994 The Dragon, the Earl, and the Troll, fantasy novel, Ace (hardcover)
 1994 Other, sf novel,  Tor (hardcover and paperback)
 1995 The Magnificent Wilf, sf novel, Baen
 1996 The Dragon and the Djinn, fantasy novel, Ace (hardcover and paperback)
 1997 The Dragon and the Gnarly King, fantasy novel,  Tor (hardcover)
 1997 The Final Encyclopedia: Vol 2,  Tor / Orb
 1998 The Dragon in Lyonesse, fantasy novel,  Tor Books (hardcover)

2000s
 2000 The Right to Arm Bears, collection of three sf/fantasy novellas, Baen
 2001 The Dragon and the Fair Maid of Kent, fantasy novel,  Tor and  SF Book Club (hardcover)
 2002 Dorsai Spirit, novel and collection omnibus,  Tor (hardcover)
 Dorsai! [also known as The Genetic General], (1960 novel)
 The Spirit of Dorsai, (1979 collection)
 2002 Four to Dorsai!, 4 novel omnibus, SF Book Club (hardcover)  #14301
 Dorsai! (1959 novel)
 Necromancer, (1962 novel)
 Soldier, Ask Not, (1964 novel)
 Tactics of Mistake, (1970 novel)
 2002 Hour of the Gremlins, 3 novel omnibus, Baen
 Gremlins Go Home, (1974 novel with Ben Bova)
 The Hour of the Horde, (1970 novel)
 Wolfling, (1969 novel)

Short stories

A
 Across the River, (ss), Asimov's SF: Summer 1977
 Act of Creation, (ss), Satellite, April 1957
 The Adventure of the Misplaced Hound (w Poul Anderson), (nv), Universe, Dec 1953
 After the Funeral, (ss), Fantastic: April 1959
 Amanda Morgan, (na), The Spirit of Dorsai, Ace, 1979
 The Amulet, (ss), F&SF: April 1959
 Ancient, My Enemy, (nv), IF: Dec 1969
 And Then There Was Peace, (ss), IF: Sept, 1962
 Armageddon, (verse), The Final Encyclopedia,  Tor, 1984

B
 Babes in the Wood, (ss), Other Worlds, May 1953
 Ballad of the Shoshonu, (song), Sixth Year's Best SF, J. Merril ed, Dell, June 1961
 Battle Hymn of the Friendly Soldiers, (verse), Galaxy: Oct 1964
 Beyond the Dar al-Harb, (na), Beyond the Dar Al-Harb,  Tor, 1985
 Black Charlie, (ss), Galaxy: April 1954
 The Bleak and Barren Land, (nv), Space Stories, Feb 1953
 The Breaking of Jerry McCloud, (ss), Universe, Sept 1953
 Breakthrough Gang, (ss), F&SF: Dec 1965
 Brother Charlie, (nv), F&SF: July 1958
 Brothers, (na), Astounding: H. Harrison ed, Random, 1973
 The Brown Man, (verse), The Final Encyclopedia,  Tor, 1984
 Building on the Line, (nv), Galaxy: Nov 1968
 Button, Button, (ss), F&SF: Sept 1960
 By New Hearth Fires, (ss), Astounding: Jan 1959

C
 Call Him Lord, (ss), Analog: May 1966 Nebula Award
 Carry Me Home, (nv), IF: Nov 1954
 A Case History, (ss), F&SF: Dec 1954
 The Catch, (ss), Astounding: April 1959
 Catch a Tartar, (nv), Worlds of Tomorrow: Sept 1965
 The Christmas Present, (ss), F&SF: Jan 1958
 Cloak and Stagger, (nv), Future: Fall 1957
 The Cloak and the Staff, (nv), Analog: Aug 1980 Hugo Award
 Computers Don't Argue, (ss), Analog: Sept 1965
 Counter-Irritant, (ss), Future: Nov 1953

D
 Danger! Human!, (ss), Astounding Dec 1957
 Dolphin's Way, (ss), Analog: June 1964
 Don Jones (w Poul Anderson), (nv), Earthman's Burden, Gnome, 1957
 The Dreamsman, (ss), Star SF #6, F. Pohl ed, Ballantine, 1959

E
 E Gubling Dow, (ss), Satellite, May 1959
 Enter a Pilgrim, (ss), Analog: Aug 1974
 The Error of Their Ways, (ss), Astounding: July 1951

F
 The Faithful Wilf, (ss), Galaxy: June 1963
 Fellow of the Bees, (nv), Orbit #3, 1954
 Fido, (ss), F&SF: Nov 1957
 Flat Tiger, (ss), Galaxy: Mar 1956
 Fleegl of Fleegl, (ss), Venture, May 1958
 Friend for Life, (ss), Venture, Mar 1957
 The Friendly Man, (ss), Astounding: Feb 1951
 Full Pack {Hokas Wild} (w Poul Anderson), (nv), F&SF: Oct 1957

G
 The Game of Five, (nv), F&SF: Sept 1957 (& April 1960)
 The General and the Axe, (nv), Infinity: Nov 1957
 Gifts, (ss), Astounding: Nov 1958
 The Girl Who Played Wolf, (ss), Fantastic: Aug 1958
 God Bless Them, (nv), The Best of Omni SF No. 3, B. Bova & D, Myrus eds, Omni, 1982
 Graveyard, (nv), Future: July 1953
 The Green Building, (ss), Satellite, Dec 1956
 Guided Tour, (verse), F&SF: Oct 1959

H
 The Hard Way, (nv), Analog: Jan 1963
 The Haunted Village, (nv), F&SF: Aug 1961
 Heroes Are Made (w Poul Anderson)(aka The Sheriff of Canyon Gulch), (ss), Other Worlds, May 1951
 Hilifter, (ss), Analog: Feb 1963
 Home from the Shore, (nv), Galaxy: Feb 1963
 Homecoming, (ss), IF: Sept 1959
 An Honorable Death, (ss), Galaxy: Feb 1961
 The Hours Are Good, (ss), Galaxy: Oct 1960
 House of Weapons, (na), Far Frontiers Vol. II, J. Pournelle & J. Baen eds, Baen, 1985

I
 Idiot Solvant, (ss), Analog: Jan 1962
 The Immortal, (nv), F&SF: Aug 1965
 In Hoka Signo Vinces (w Poul Anderson), (ss), Other Worlds, June 1953
 In Iron Years, (nv), F&SF: Oct 1974
 In the Bone, (ss), IF: Oct 1966
 The Invaders, (na), Space Stories, Oct 1952
 It Hardly Seems Fair, (ss), Amazing: April 1960
 IT, Out of Darkest Jungle, (play), Fantastic: Dec 1964
 Itco's Strong Right Arm, (nv), Cosmos SF&F, July 1954
 I've Been Trying to Tell You, (ss), Fantastic Universe: Nov 1959

J
 Jackal's Meal, (nv), Analog: June 1969
 James, (ss), F&SF: May 1955
 Jean Dupres, (nv), Nova 1, H. Harrison ed, Delacorte, 1970
 Joy in Mudville (w Poul Anderson), (nv), F&SF: Nov 1955

K
 None.

L
 The Last Dream, (ss), F&SF: July 1960
 Last Voyage, (ss), Science Fiction Stories, July 1958
 The Law-Twister Shorty, (nv), The Many Worlds of Science Fiction, B. Bova ed, Dutton, 1971
 Listen, (ss), F&SF: Aug 1952
 Lost Dorsai, (na), Destinies, Feb 1980 Hugo Award
 Love Me True, (ss), Analog: Oct 1961
 Love Song, (?), The Last Dangerous Visions, H. Ellison ed, (hasn't appeared as yet)
 Lulungomeena, (ss), Galaxy: Jan 1954

M
 The Man from Earth, (ss), Galaxy: June 1964
 The Man in the Mailbag, (nv), Galaxy: April 1959
 The Man the Worlds Rejected, (nv), Planet Stories: July 1953
 A Matter of Technique, (ss), F&SF: May 1958
 Maverick (aka Walker Between the Planes), (na), Worlds of Fantasy #2, 1970
 Minotaur, (ss), IF: Mar 1961
 Miss Prinks, (ss), F&SF: June 1954
 The Monkey Wrench, (ss), Astounding: Aug 1951
 The Monster and the Maiden (aka The Mortal and the Monster), (na), Stellar Short Novels, J-L del Rey ed, Ballantine, 1976
 Moon, June, Spoon, Croon, (ss), Startling Stories: Summer 1955
 The Mortal and the Monster (aka The Monster and the Maiden), (na), Stellar Short Novels, J-L del Rey ed, Ballantine, 1976
 The Mousetrap, (ss), Galaxy: Sept 1952
 MX Knows Best, (nv), Saturn, July 1957
 The Napoleon Crime (w Poul Anderson), (nv), Analog: Mar 1983

N
 Napoleon's Skullcap, (nv), F&SF: May 1962
 No Shield from the Dead, (ss), IF: Jan 1953

O
 The Odd Ones, (ss), IF: Feb, 1955
 Of the People, (ss), F&SF: Dec 1955
 Of War and Codes and Honor (w Chelsea Quinn Yarbro), (na), The Harriers, Baen, 1991
 On Messenger Mountain, (na), Worlds of Tomorrow: June 1964
 One on Trial, (ss), F&SF: May 1960
 Operation P-Button, (vignette), Infinity: R. Hoskins ed, Lancer, 1970
 An Ounce of Emotion, (nv), IF: Oct 1965
 Our First Death, (nv), F&SF: Aug 1955
 Out of the Darkness, (ss), Ellery Queen, Feb 1961
 A Outrance, (verse), The Final Encyclopedia,  Tor, 1984

P
 Perfectly Adjusted, (na), Science Fiction Stories, July 1955
 Powerway Emergency, (ss), Northern States Power Company, 1972
 Pro, (nv), Analog: Sept 1975

Q
 The Quarry, (ss), Astounding: Sept 1958
 The Queer Critter, (ss), Orbit #5, 1954
 The Question, (ss), Astounding: May 1958

R
 The R of A, (ss), F&SF: Jan 1959
 The Rebels, (ss), Fantastic Story Magazine: Winter 1954
 Rehabilitated, (ss), F&SF: Jan 1961
 Rescue, (ss), Future: June 1954
 Rescue Mission, (ss), F&SF: Jan 1957
 Rex and Mr. Rejilla, (ss), Galaxy: Jan 1958
 Ricochet on Miza, (ss), Planet Stories: Mar 1952
 Robots are Nice? (ss), Galaxy: Oct 1957
 Roofs of Silver, (nv), F&SF: Dec 1962

S

 St. Dragon and the George, (nv), F&SF: Sept 1957
 Salmanazar, (ss), F&SF: Aug 1962
 Seats of Hell, (na), Fantastic: Oct 1960
 See Now, a Pilgrim, (na), Analog: Sept 1985
 The Sheriff of Canyon Gulch (w Poul Anderson) (aka Heroes Are Made), (ss), Other Worlds, May 1951
 Show Me the Way to Go Home, (ss), Startling Stories: Dec 1952
 Sleight of Wit, (nv), Analog: Dec 1961
 Soldier, Ask Not, (na), Galaxy: Oct 1964 Hugo Award
 Soupstone, (nv), Analog: July 1965
 St. Dragon and the George, (nv), F&SF: Sept 1957
 The Star Fool, (ss), Planet Stories: Sept 1951
 Steel Brother, (nv), Astounding: Feb 1952
 The Stranger, (ss), Imagination: May 1952
 Strictly Confidential, (ss), Fantastic Universe: Dec 1956
 The Summer Visitors, (ss), Fantastic: April 1960

T
 A Taste of Tenure, (nv), IF: July 1961
 Tempus Non Fugit, (nv), Science Fiction Stories, Mar 1957
 Things Which Are Caesar's, (na), The Day the Sun Stood Still, R. Silverberg ed, T. Nelson, 1972
 The Three, (ss), Startling Stories: May 1953
 Three-Part Puzzle, (ss), Analog: June 1962
 The Tiddlywink Warriors (w Poul Anderson), (nv), F&SF: Aug 1955
 Tiger Green, (nv), IF: Nov 1965
 Time Grabber, (ss), Imagination: Dec 1952
 Time Storm, (?), Asimov's SF: Spring 1977
 Trespass! (w Poul Anderson), (ss), Fantastic Story Quarterly, Spring 1950
 Turnabout, (nv), IF: Jan 1955
 Twig, (nv), Stellar #1, Judy-Lynn del Rey ed, Ballantine, 1974
 The Underground, (nv), Imagination: Dec 1955

U
 Undiplomatic Immunity (w Poul Anderson), (nv), F&SF: May 1957

V
 None.

W
 Walker Between the Planes (aka Maverick), (na), Worlds of Fantasy #2, 1970
 Warrior, (nv), Analog: Dec 1965
 Whatever Gods There Be, (ss), Amazing: July 1961
 Who Dares a Bulbur Eat? (ss), Galaxy: Oct 1962
 With Butter and Mustard, (ss), F&SF: Dec 1957
 A Wobble in Wockii Futures, (nv), Galaxy: April 1965

X
 None.

Y
 Ye Prentice and Ye Dragon, (verse), Analog: Jan 1975
 Yo Ho Hoka! (w Poul Anderson), (nv), F&SF: Mar 1955

Z
 Zeepsday, (ss), F&SF: Nov 1956

Resources
 GORDON R. DICKSON - SF & Fantasy Bibliography
 Index to Science Fiction Anthologies and Collections
 
Bibliography
Dickson, Gordon R.
Dickson, Gordon R.